Zhang Yuanshu (born 25 May 1997) is a Chinese footballer currently playing as a midfielder for Shandong Taishan.

Club career
Zhang was loaned to Brazilian teams Desportivo Brasil and São Paulo during his youth development.

In May 2022, he was loaned to China League One side Zibo Cuju.

Career statistics

Club

Notes

References

1997 births
Living people
Chinese footballers
Chinese expatriate footballers
Association football midfielders
Shandong Taishan F.C. players
São Paulo FC players
Zibo Cuju F.C. players
China League One players
Chinese expatriate sportspeople in Brazil
Expatriate footballers in Brazil